Sudice is a municipality and village in Opava District in the Moravian-Silesian Region of the Czech Republic. It has about 600 inhabitants. It is part of the historic Hlučín Region.

Geography

Sudice is located in the northern tip of the historic Hlučín Region within the Upper Silesia, on the border with Poland. The municipality lies in the Opava Hilly Land within the Silesian Lowlands.

History
The first written mention of Sudice is from 1327, when it was part of the Duchy of Troppau and Nicholas II, Duke of Opava sold Sudice to the Dominican monastery seated in nearby Racibórz. In the 14th century, a fortress was built.

In the first half of the 16th century, Sudice was promoted to a market town and divided into two parts. In 1557 Sudice was bought by the Oderský of Lidéřov family and reunited the two parts. The fortress was replaced by a Baroque castle in the second half of the 17th century. However, the Henneberk family, who were the next owners of Sudice, had the castle demolished in 1786.

From 1938 to 1945, the municipality was annexed by Nazi Germany. After the World War II, the German population was expelled.

Transport
There is the road border crossing Sudice / Pietraszyn.

Sights
The landmark of Sudice is the pseudo-Gothic Church of Saint John the Baptist from the early 20th century. The entire church complex is a cultural monument.

References

External links

Villages in Opava District
Hlučín Region